Villaverde is one of the 21 districts of the city of Madrid, Spain.

Geography and history

The municipality was absorbed by Madrid in the 1950s as a result of the plans that the Franco government made to simplify the structure of big city administrations. Since then, is a district. It was in those years when it experimented a massive growth caused by the rural flight in Spain. This is the reason that made Villaverde a typical working class neighbourhood. 

This condition leaves a heavy footprint in the district, because it has conditioned the current population composition, with many retired people (some of them returning to their towns in Andalusia, Castile-León, ...) and immigrants attracted by the cheap housing prices.

The district is administratively divided into five wards:
Butarque
Los Ángeles
Los Rosales
San Cristóbal de los Ángeles
 Villaverde Alto

External links 

 
Districts of Madrid